Hovhannes Goharyan (born 18 March 1988) is a retired Armenian footballer and current manager. He last played for the Armenian Premier League club Ulisses FC in 2015.

Career
Goharyan made his debut for Armenia against Moldova on 12 August 2009, and scored his first international goal against Belgium on 9 September 2009.

In 2017, he became the technical director of the Russian 4th-division club FC Nika Moscow.

Honours
 BATE Borisov
Belarusian Premier League: 1
 2009
Belarusian Supercup: 1
 2009
 Pyunik Yerevan
Armenian Premier League: 1
 2010

International goals

|}

External links
 
 
 Profile at FC BATE website
 Profile at FFA's website

1988 births
Living people
People from Gavar
Armenian footballers
Association football forwards
Armenia international footballers
Expatriate footballers in Russia
Expatriate footballers in Belarus
Armenian expatriate footballers
Armenian Premier League players
FC Lokomotiv Moscow players
FC BATE Borisov players
FC Pyunik players
FC Impuls Dilijan players